The FA Trophy is the main annual knockout cup competition in English non-League football. 

FA Trophy may also refer to:
 Maltese FA Trophy, Malta's main men's football cup competition
 Trinidad and Tobago FA Trophy, Trinidad and Tobago's main men's football cup competition